Matteo Bogani (born 2 May 1982) is a former Italian footballer. He started his career as a forward but was later also deployed as a midfielder.

Career
Born in Como, Lombardy, 45 km north of Milan, Bogani started his career at F.C. Internazionale Milano. He played with the Primavera U20 youth team during the 2000–01 season, and in September 2001, he was loaned to Fidelis Andria along with teammate Roberto Capetti. Co-currently, he was sold to A.C. Milan in exchange with Paolo Ginestra, which created a "profit" of €3.5million, but the sell of Bogani's profit was in terms of Ginestra's registration rights. Milan and Inter had done the deals to gain false profit in 1999 to 2001, and 2003 (include Bogani's youth team teammate Marco Varaldi, Salvatore Ferraro and Alessandro Livi). The two clubs finally fined in 2008. and 5 other clubs were also fined.

After spending a season at Andria, he moved to Sassuolo on loan along with Ginestra. In January 2003, he returned to AC Milan and joined Legnano.

Since the 2003–04 and 2004–05 seasons, he played for Tolentino, where he played 50 league matches in the last seasons.

References

External links
 Profile at calciatori.com 

Italian footballers
S.S. Fidelis Andria 1928 players
Inter Milan players
U.S. Sassuolo Calcio players
A.C. Legnano players
Association football forwards
Sportspeople from Como
1982 births
Living people
Footballers from Lombardy